is a Japanese television series which premiered on Fuji TV on October 22, 2012. This television series stars Takuya Kimura as Fumio Kindaichi, a salaryman who gets fired from his company after he was accused of being involved in commercial espionage. Coupled with a series of unfortunate accidents, Fumio suddenly loses everything he has and becomes poor.

Plot
Fumio Kindaichi is a middle management salaryman on good terms with his co-workers. One day, he is suddenly accused of stealing commercial secrets, and is fired by his company. He's even ostracized by his co-workers. Before the end of the day, he has essentially become a homeless and penniless man. Without any idea of how to survive on the streets, he has to settle in for a rough night.

Fumio later learns how to earn some money on the street from two children, brothers, he meets. They lead him to a boarding house that allows him to stay for 500 yen per night. In the struggle to earn this sum of money, Fumio begins to appreciate the worth of money. He also learns that not all precious things in life can be bought with money.

Despite his predicament, Fumio remains an optimistic person, and does not feel bitter over his sudden dismissal. Instead, he helps the people around him with much enthusiasm, without asking for anything in return.

Cast
 Takuya Kimura as Fumio Kindaichi
 Kiichi Nakai as Kengo Moai
 Karina Nose as Saya Nikaido
 Taisuke Fujigaya as Kotaro Enomoto
 Misako Renbutsu as Yoko Hirose
 Takeshi Masu as Takeshi Fujisawa
 Oshiro Maeda as Kanta Marioka
 Kanau Tanaka as Ryota Marioka
 Atsuo Nakamura as Iwao Oyashiki
 Issey Ogata as Osamu Zaizen
 Mari Natsuki as Ichirin Marioka
 Naohito Fujiki as Toichiro Oyashiki
 Haruna Kojima as Moe Tomizawa (Ep.3-5, 7-10)

Episodes

Reception
The first episode of Priceless had the third-highest viewership rating of all Autumn 2012 Japanese television drama debut episodes with a rating of 16.9% in the Kanto region, behind Aibou 11 (with a rating of 19.9%) and Doctor-X: Surgeon Michiko Daimon (with a rating of 18.6%). This marks the first time that a drama starring actor Takuya Kimura had debuted with a rating of less than 20%. This low viewership rating was attributed to the fact that the drama had to compete with a popular baseball match airing concurrently on another television network, which garnered a rating of 20.1% itself.

International broadcast
It aired in Thailand on Channel 7 beginning April 24, 2015, dubbed as Yodchai Naiyajok . ("ยอดชาย นายยาจก", literally: Super Beggar).
In Sri Lanka, it began airing in October 2016 on WakuWaku Japan with English subtitles under the title, Priceless: Is There Such a Thing.

References

External links
  

Japanese drama television series
Fuji TV dramas
2012 Japanese television series debuts
2012 Japanese television series endings